Everybody is a 2007 studio album by The Sea and Cake, released on Thrill Jockey.

Critical reception
At Metacritic, which assigns a weighted average score out of 100 to reviews from mainstream critics, Everybody received an average score of 74% based on 24 reviews, indicating "generally favorable reviews."

Jason Crock of Pitchfork gave the album a 7.6 out of 10, saying, "It's been four years since their last album, and Chicago's post-rock heyday has past, but the Sea and Cake remain relevant simply by becoming more transparent." Michael Franco of PopMatters gave the album 6 stars out of 10, stating that "this is the most rock-based album the Sea and Cake have made, but it still sounds modern, sophisticated, and ultra-cool." Vish Khanna of Exclaim! called it "a mature yet adventurous effort by the Sea and Cake."

Track listing

Personnel
 Sam Prekop – vocals, guitar
 Archer Prewitt – guitar, vocals, keyboards
 Eric Claridge – bass guitar, keyboards
 John McEntire – drums, vibraphone, keyboards, percussion
 Ken Champion – pedal steel guitar

Charts

References

External links
 
 Everybody at Thrill Jockey

2007 albums
The Sea and Cake albums
Thrill Jockey albums